Zimtenga, also spelt Zimtanga, is a department or commune of Bam Province in Centre-Nord Region of Burkina Faso. Its capital lies at the town of Zimtenga. According to the 1996 census the department has a total population of 21,879.

Towns and villages
 Zimtenga (capital)
 Bangrin
 Bargo
 Batanga
 Bayendfoulgo
 Bonda
 Dénéon
 Dougré
 Douré
 Gasdonka
 Kalagré-Foulbé
 Kalagré-Mossi
 Kalagrérimaïbé
 Kaokana-Peulh
 Kargo
 Kayon
 Kiendyendé
 Komsilga
 Konkin-Foulgo
 Konkin-Moogo
 Loa
 Minima
 Moméné
 Niniongo
 Nordé
 Paspanga
 Pètakakisgou
 Pissi
 Rakoegtanga
 Rolga
 Romtanghin
 Siguinvoussé
 Singa-Mossi
 Singa-Rimaïbé
 Sissin
 Songédin-Yarcé
 Tampèlga
 Tankoulounga
 Toéssin
 Wattigué
 Yalgatinga

References

Departments of Burkina Faso
Bam Province